Ran Dedunnak (The Rainbow) is a 2016 Sri Lankan Sinhala masala film directed by Nalin Rajapakshe and produced by Raja Balasooriya for Moonlight Films. It stars Roshan Ranawana and newcomer Tanasha Satharasinghe in lead roles along with Rex Kodippili and Kumara Thirimadura. Music composed by Udaya Sri Wickramasinghe. It is the 1259th Sri Lankan film in the Sinhala cinema.

Plot
Story revolves around a young man named Roshan who comes to Colombo in search of life and encounters dashing lass in the city who happens to be a journalist. The female journalist who named Nishani is caught in a drug haul that she has been trying to expose to the public via media. King Pin of the drug mafia is on the hunt for the female journalist. In the midst of this controversy she encounters her lover to be, the young macho man who comes to town out of the blues.

Cast
 Roshan Ranawana as Roshan
 Tanasha Satharasinghe as Nishani
 Rex Kodippili as Minister Weerarathne
 Kumara Thirimadura as Victor
 Nadeeka Gunasekara as Shiva's mother
 Mihira Sirithilaka as Bala
 Raneesh Shyamanga as Shiva
 Shanudrie Priyasad as Rashmi
 Susila Kottage as Woman at gym
 Nilmini Kottegoda as Woman at gym
 Wasantha Kumaravila as Mark
 Dinakshie Priyasad as Roshan's sister
 Raja Ganeshan as Shiva's father
 Dayasiri Hettiarachchi as Roshan's father
 D.B. Gangodathenna

Soundtrack

References

External links
සිංහල සිනමාවට රන් දේදුනු පායන අලුත්ම චිත්‍රපටය The Rainbow

2016 films
2010s Sinhala-language films